Hugo Jan Huss (January 26, 1934 – February 21, 2006) was an orchestra conductor and music director.

He was born in Timișoara, Romania and died in La Crosse, Wisconsin. He studied at the Bucharest Conservatory of Music where he was the favorite student of Constantin Silvestri. After graduation, he became conductor and music director of the Symphony Orchestra in Arad, a city in western Romania, close to his native town. In 1968, he went to Paris, France, and did not return to Romania. Later he was conductor and music director in Mexico and, from 1977, in Wisconsin. He is buried in Arad's Pomenirea Cemetery.

Notes

Sources 
 Hugo Huss Memorial Website
 A life Remembered: Conductor brought symphony to a new level, Terry Rindfleisch, La Crosse Tribune
Hugo Jan Huss, obituary, La Crosse Tribune

1934 births
2006 deaths
American male conductors (music)
People from La Crosse, Wisconsin
Musicians from Timișoara
Romanian emigrants to the United States
Romanian conductors (music)
Male conductors (music)
20th-century American conductors (music)
20th-century American male musicians
National University of Music Bucharest alumni